John Joseph Amalfitano (born January 23, 1934) is a former utility infielder, manager and coach in Major League Baseball (MLB). He played a combined ten seasons with the New York and San Francisco Giants (1954–55; 1960–61; 1963), Houston Colt .45s (1962) and Chicago Cubs (1964–67), and managed the Cubs from 1979–81.

Amalfitano was the Los Angeles Dodgers' third-base coach for sixteen years (1983–98), which included the 1988 World Series championship. After serving as a special assistant for player development for the Giants, primarily working in the club's farm system, the team announced in January 2021 that Amalfitano would retire just shy of his 87th birthday on January 23 after 30 years and five different terms.

Playing career
A native of San Pedro, California, Amalfitano attended Saint Anthony High School in Long Beach, Loyola University of Los Angeles, and the University of Southern California. In 642 MLB games played, he batted .244 in 1,715 at bats with 418 hits and nine home runs.

Managerial/coaching career
After playing his final game on June 27, 1967, Amalfitano became a coach for the Cubs, serving under his first-ever manager, Leo Durocher.

Amalfitano served as Chicago's interim manager after Franks' resignation in September 1979, compiling a record of 2–5 to finish the season. That autumn, the Cubs appointed Preston Gómez manager, with Amalfitano retained as a coach. But when Chicago started the  campaign poorly under Gómez, winning only 38 of its first 90 games, he was fired July 25 and Amalfitano was named his permanent successor. During that strike-shortened, split-season campaign, his team won a total of 38 games, losing 65, finishing last and next-to-last with the worst overall record in the division. At season's end, he was fired during a general housecleaning of the Chicago front office. Amalfitano's career record as a manager, over all or parts of three seasons with the Cubs, was 66–116 (.363).

He remained active in baseball, returning to coaching with the Cincinnati Reds and then spending 16 seasons as the third base coach for the Los Angeles Dodgers (1983–98). He then was a consultant with the Dodgers' baseball operations department and worked with minor league infielders in his original organization, the Giants, before assuming his current position with them. His primary role has been to instruct the Giants' minor leaguers on baseball fundamentals, especially bunting.

References

External links

   

1934 births
Living people
American expatriate baseball players in Canada
American people of Italian descent
Baseball coaches from California
Baseball players from California
Chicago Cubs coaches
Chicago Cubs managers
Chicago Cubs players
Cincinnati Reds coaches
Dallas Eagles players
Houston Colt .45s players
Johnstown Johnnies players
Los Angeles Dodgers coaches
Loyola Marymount Lions baseball players
Major League Baseball first base coaches
Major League Baseball second basemen
Major League Baseball third base coaches
Minneapolis Millers (baseball) players
New York Giants (NL) players
People from San Pedro, Los Angeles
Phoenix Giants players
San Diego Padres coaches
San Francisco Giants coaches
San Francisco Giants players
Tacoma Cubs players
Tacoma Giants players
Toronto Maple Leafs (International League) players